Zanthoxyloideae is a subfamily of the family Rutaceae.

Genera
The division of the subfamily into genera varied, . Genera accepted in a 2021 classification of Rutaceae into subfamilies were:

 Acmadenia Bartl. & H.L.Wendl.
 Acradenia Kippist
 Acronychia J.R.Forst. & G.Forst.
 Adenandra Willd.
 Adiscanthus Ducke
 Agathosma Willd.
 Andreadoxa Kallunki
 Angostura Roem. & Schult.
 Apocaulon R.S.Cowan
 Asterolasia F.Muell.
 Balfourodendron Mello ex Oliv.
 Boronia Sm.
 Bosistoa F.Muell. ex Benth.
 Bouchardatia Baill.
 Brombya F.Muell.
 Calodendrum Thunb.
 Casimiroa La Llave
 Choisya Kunth
 Chorilaena Endl.
 Coatesia F.Muell., syn. Geijera Schott
 Coleonema Bartl. & H.L.Wendl.
 Comptonella Baker f.
 Conchocarpus J.C.Mikan
 Correa Andrews
 Crossosperma T.G.Hartley
 Crowea Sm.
 Cyanothamnus Lindl.
 Decagonocarpus Engl.
 Decatropis Hook.f.
 Decazyx Pittier & S.F.Blake
 Desmotes Kallunki
 Dictamnus L.
 Dinosperma T.G.Hartley
 Diosma L.
 Diplolaena R.Br.
 Drummondita Harv.
 Dutailliopsis T.G.Hartley
 Dutaillyea Baill.
 Empleurum Aiton
 Eriostemon Sm.
 Ertela Adans.
 Erythrochiton Nees & Mart.
 Esenbeckia Kunth
 Euchaetis Bartl. & H.L.Wendl.
 Euodia J.R.Forst. & G.Forst.
 Euxylophora Huber
 Fagaropsis Mildbr.
 Flindersia R.Br.
 Galipea Aubl.
 Geijera Schott
 Geleznowia Turcz.
 Halfordia F.Muell.
 Helietta Tul.
 Hortia Vand.
 Ivodea Capuron
 Leionema (F.Muell.) Paul G.Wilson
 Leptothyrsa Hook.f.
 Lubaria Pittier
 Lunasia Blanco
 Maclurodendron T.G.Hartley
 Macrostylis Bartl. & H.L.Wendl.
 Medicosma Hook.f.
 Megastigma Hook.f.
 Melicope J.R.Forst. & G.Forst.
 Metrodorea A.St.-Hil.
 Microcybe Turcz.
 Muiriantha C.A.Gardner
 Myrtopsis Engl.
 Naudinia Planch. & Linden
 Nematolepis Turcz.
 Neobyrnesia J.A.Armstr.
 Neoraputia Emmerich ex Kallunki
 Neoschmidea T.G.Hartley
 Orixa Thunb.
 Peltostigma Walp.
 Pentaceras Hook.f.
 Perryodendron T.G.Hartley
 Phebalium Vent.
 Phellodendron Rupr.
 Philotheca Rudge
 Phyllosma Bolus ex Schltr.
 Picrella Baill.
 Pilocarpus Vahl
 Pitavia Molina
 Pitaviaster T.G.Hartley
 Plethadenia Urb.
 Polyaster Hook.f.
 Ptelea L.
 Raputia Aubl.
 Raputiarana Emmerich
 Rauia Nees & Mart.
 Raulinoa R.S.Cowan
 Ravenia Vell.
 Raveniopsis Gleason
 Rhadinothamnus Paul G.Wilson
 Rutaneblina Steyerm. & Luteyn
 Sarcomelicope Engl.
 Sheilanthera I.Williams
 Sigmatanthus Huber ex Emmerich
 Skimmia Thunb.
 Spiranthera A.St.-Hil.
 Tetractomia Hook.f.
 Tetradium Lour.
 Ticorea Aubl.
 Toxosiphon Baill.
 Vepris Comm. ex A Juss.
 Zanthoxylum L.
 Zieria Sm.

Some further genera placed in the subfamily by the Angiosperm Phylogeny Website include:
 Afraurantium A.Chevalier
 Araliopsis Engl., syn. Vepris Comm. ex A Juss.
 Bouzetia Montrouzier
 Coombea P.Royen, syn. Medicosma Hook.f.
 Dendrosma Pancher & Sebert, syn. Geijera Schott
 Nycticalanthus Ducke, syn. Spiranthera A.St.-Hil.
 Toddalia Juss., syn. Zanthoxylum L.
 Urocarpus J.Drumm. ex Harv., syn. Asterolasia F.Muell.

References

 
Rosid subfamilies